Anastasia's Chosen Career (1987) is a young-adult novel by Lois Lowry. It is the seventh part of a series of books that Lowry wrote about Anastasia and her younger brother Sam.

After being assigned a school essay on her chosen career, Anastasia spends her vacation unsuccessfully trying to interview a bookshop owner and attending a modeling class which has a number of similarities to the Barbizon modeling school franchise.

Reception 
"Lowry gives readers a fine mixture of wit and wisdom, offering funny adolescent dialogue that is true to their interests and language."—School Library Journal, starred review

References

External links 
 Description from Lowry's website.
Lowry's website
Complete list of books by Lowry

1987 American novels
American young adult novels
Novels by Lois Lowry